In sociology, allophilia is having a positive attitude towards outgroup members. The outgroup members can be anyone who possesses characteristics that are different from one's own, such as people of different races, religions, cultures, etc. It is a framework for understanding effective intergroup leadership and is conceptualized as a measurable state of mind with tangible consequences.

Terminology
The term allophilia was coined by Harvard professor Todd L. Pittinsky in 2006, after he was unable to find an antonym for prejudice in any dictionary. The term derived from Greek words meaning "liking or love of the other".

Statistical factors
 affection,
 comfort,
 engagement,
 enthusiasm,
 kinship.

The allophilia scale measures each of these factors. It has been adapted and validated to other languages such as Italian and Spanish, also to various settings, such as to measure positive attitude toward people with dementia, younger and older adults.

Prejudice and positive intergroup relations

The typical remedy for prejudice is to bring conflicting groups into a state of tolerance. However, tolerance is not the logical antithesis of prejudice, but rather is the midpoint between negative feelings and positive feelings toward others. Allophilia enhancement should serve as complement to prejudice reduction.

Allophilia predicts positive relationships with outgroup members. For instance, a study in Spain shows that students having higher allophilia had lower social distance toward people with obesity. Besides, positive experience with outgroup members may increase allophilia, as it is shown in a longitudinal study of a cook's tour in Vietnam. In that study, the participants, who were Americans, reported positive feelings toward Vietnamese mirroring Allophilia facets in nearly 10 years after the event.

In one study, symhedonia (experiencing empathic joy) has been shown to be more closely associated with allophilia, while sympathy (experiencing empathic sorrow) has been shown to be more strongly associated with prejudice.

See also

 Xenophilia

References

External links 
Speech by Minnesota Department of Human Rights Commissioner on Allophilia
Those People: Article about Allophilia by the Boston Globe 

Admiration of foreign cultures
2000s neologisms
2006 neologisms